Fontenay-sur-Mer (literally Fontenay on Sea) is a commune in the Manche department in north-western France.

See also
Communes of the Manche department

References

Fontenaysurmer
Populated coastal places in France